The 2020 MAC Championship Game was a college football game played on Friday, December 18, 2020, at Ford Field in Detroit, Michigan, to determine the 2020 champion of the Mid-American Conference (MAC). The game was contested by the Buffalo Bulls, East Division champions, and the Ball State Cardinals, West Division champions. Sponsored by mortgage lending company Quicken Loans through their Rocket Mortgage brand, the game was officially known as the Rocket Mortgage MAC Championship Game. Ball State defeated Buffalo, 38–28 to claim their first MAC championship since 1996.

Teams

Ball State

Ball State entered the championship game as West Division champions, having compiled a 5–1 record, all in conference games. After losing their first game of the season to Miami (OH), the Cardinals won five consecutive games leading up to the conference championship game. Ball State's only prior appearance in the MAC Championship Game had been a loss to Buffalo in the 2008 edition.

Buffalo

Buffalo entered the championship game as East Division champions, having compiled a 5–0 record, all in conference games. The Bulls scored at least 42 points in each of their five games, winning each game by at least 19 points. Buffalo's two prior appearances in the  MAC Championship Game had been a win over Ball State in 2008 and a loss to Northern Illinois in the 2018 edition.

Game summary

Statistics

See also
List of Mid-American Conference football champions

References

Championship
MAC Championship Game
Ball State Cardinals football games
Buffalo Bulls football games
American football competitions in Detroit
MAC Championship
MAC Championship
MAC Championship